The Harold Green Jewish Theatre is a professional theatre company in Toronto, Ontario, Canada.   The artistic directors are David Eisner and Avery Saltzman. 
The theatre was founded in 2006 with a mandate to "illuminate humanity through a Jewish perspective."

External links
 Harold Green Jewish Theatre Company

Notes

Jewish theatres
Theatre companies in Toronto
Jewish Canadian culture
Jewish organizations based in Canada
Jews and Judaism in Toronto
Performing groups established in 2006